The Bible Baptist Church is a Baptist church located in Gżira, Malta.

History
The first Baptist congregation knows its beginning in 1985, founded by Joseph Mifsud and his wife Jenny. Prior to the building of the present church, the congregation used to meet up in rented premises however, eventually, a permit was issued for the building of a new church which was completed by 1993. The first service in the church was held on April 14, 1994.

References

20th-century Baptist churches
Gżira
Churches completed in 1993